Akademski košarkarski klub Branik Maribor, commonly referred to as AKK Branik Maribor or simply Branik, is a basketball team based in Maribor, Slovenia. As of the 2022–23 season, Branik competes in the Slovenian Third League, the third level of Slovenian basketball.

Branik was originally formed in 1948 as a basketball section of SŠD Polet, but they folded in 2005 due to financial problems. A new club called ŠD Primorac was founded in 2001 and joined the Branik Sports Association in 2008. The club regard themselves as the continuation of the 2005 dissolved team.

History

1948–2005
The club was formed in 1948 as a basketball section of SŠD Polet. In 1950, Polet renamed as Branik and won its first Slovenian republic title in 1952 after defeating Krim in the final. In 1966, the club left the Branik Sports Association and renamed as KK Maribor 66. Under that name, they played in the Yugoslav First Federal Basketball League in the 1969–70 season. The club then competed as KK Marles due to the sponsorship agreement, while the Branik Sports Association formed its own team to compete in lower ranks. After Marles relegated to the republic level (third tier in Yugoslavia), both teams merged back in 1975 under the name Branik. In 1987, the club merged with city rivals ŽKK Maribor to form KK Maribor 87 as a new city team. The latter played in the Yugoslav 1. B League, but after Slovenia's independence in 1991 it disintegrated back to ŽKK and Branik. Branik took Maribor 87's place in the Slovenian top division and played there until 2000. All teams based in Maribor, including Branik, folded in 2005.

2008–present
ŠD Primorac Basketball School, formed in 2001, joined the Branik Sports Association in 2008 and renamed as AKK Branik in 2011. The team qualified for the Slovenian Second League in the 2007–08 season. Branik was relegated back to the third division after finishing dead last in the 2012–13 season. After KK Maribor went bankrupt in 2015 and Branik remained the only basketball team in the city, the Basketball Federation of Slovenia invited them to compete in the Slovenian Second League for the 2015–16 season.

Arena
The team's home arena is Ljudski vrt Sports Hall in Maribor with a capacity of 2,100.

Season-by-season records

As Maribor 66

References

External links
Official website 

Basketball teams established in 1948
Basketball teams in Slovenia
Sport in Maribor
Basketball teams in Yugoslavia
1948 establishments in Slovenia
Basketball teams established in 2001
2001 establishments in Slovenia